Catmore and Winterly Copses is a  biological Site of Special Scientific Interest north-west of Kintbury in Berkshire.

The woods are broadleaved, mixed and yew woodland located in a lowland area.

The site is private land but a public footpath runs through Catmore Copse.

Flora

The site has the following Flora:

Trees

Birch
Fraxinus
Maple
Quercus robur
Hazel
Alder
Aspen
Prunus avium
sallow
Malus
Frangula alnus
Viburnum opulus
Prunus spinosa

Plants

Carex pallescens
Geum rivale
Lathyrus montanus
Melampyrum pratense
Valeriana dioica
Platanthera chlorantha
Lysimachia nummularia
Scutellaria galericulata
Filipendula ulmaria
Veronica beccabunga
Polygonum hydropiper
Rubus fruticosus
Pteridium aquilinum
Deschampsia cespitosa
Mercurialis perennis
Lamiastrum galeobdolon
Adoxa moschatellina
Ajuga reptans
Oxalis acetosella
Primula vulgaris
Luzula pilosa
Lysimachia nemorum
Dryopteris dilatata
Dryopteris felix-mas
Athyrium filix-femina
Blechnum spicant
Carex acutiformis

References

Sites of Special Scientific Interest in Berkshire
Kintbury